New Orleans Station is a census-designated place (CDP) covering the residential population of the Kirtland Air Force Base in  Bernalillo County, New Mexico. It first appeared as a CDP in the 2020 Census with a population of 3,838.

Demographics

2020 census

Note: the US Census treats Hispanic/Latino as an ethnic category. This table excludes Latinos from the racial categories and assigns them to a separate category. Hispanics/Latinos can be of any race.

References 

Census-designated places in Bernalillo County, New Mexico
Census-designated places in New Mexico